Tömörkény is a village near the town of Csongrád in Csongrád county, in the Southern Great Plain region of southern Hungary.

Geography

History
The first settlement was built by the Sarmatas and the Avars. There was some cemetery and iron working equipment found. It first legal sign from the 11th century, named "Temerken".  The colloquial form is 'temürkän', meaning 'arrowhead' (Oghuz Turkic equivalent is 'dämrän'). In Turkish times, a small fortress defended the local people. The old village was a harbor to move through the Tisza River. Nowadays, it is a typical agricultural village.

References

Populated places in Csongrád-Csanád County